Fairview is a secret program under which the National Security Agency cooperates with the American telecommunications company AT&T in order to collect phone, internet and e-mail data mainly of foreign countries' citizens at major cable landing stations and switching stations inside the United States. The FAIRVIEW program started in 1985, one year after the Bell breakup.

Corporate partner 
The "key corporate partner" for cooperation under the FAIRVIEW program was first identified on October 23, 2013, by the Washington Post—quoting NSA historian Matthew Aid—as
AT&T.

This was confirmed by a joint report by ProPublica and the New York Times from August 15, 2015, based upon NSA documents that describe the company as "highly collaborative" and praise the company's "extreme willingness to help".

In 2011, NSA spent $188.9 million on the program, which was twice as much as on its second-largest program, STORMBREW.

Scope of the program 
According to 2013 revelations by whistleblower Edward Snowden:

The NSA partners with a large US telecommunications company ... [which] partners with telecoms in the foreign countries, [which] then allow the US company access to those countries' telecommunications systems, and that access is then exploited to direct traffic to the NSA's repositories.

According to the revelations, the NSA had collected 2.3 billion separate pieces of data from Brazilian users in January 2013 alone.

Several weeks earlier, Snowden had revealed that the NSA was also harvesting the telephone metadata and text messages from over a billion subscribers in China; however, no precise program name was reported at the time.

A slide about the FAIRVIEW program that was seen on Brazilian television in 2013 showed a map with markers all over the United States, but without a legend that explained what they stood for. From a similar map with the proper legend, that was published in August 2015, it became clear that in 2010 the NSA had access to the following AT&T facilities:
 8 internet peering points
 26 VoIP router facilities
 1 VoIP hub router facility (with 30 planned)
 9 submarine cable landing points (with 7 planned)
 16 4ESS circuit switching stations
Except for the VoIP facilities, most of these access points are situated along the US borders.

Legal authorities 
The collection of data under the FAIRVIEW program takes place under different legal authorities: FISA, which requires individualized warrants from the FISA Court, section 702 FAA for when one end of the communications is foreign, and the Transit Authority for when both ends of a communications are foreign.

Under the FAIRVIEW program, AT&T also provided the NSA with domestic telephone metadata in bulk, which was authorized under section 215 of the USA PATRIOT Act. First this was from landline connections, but in 2011, AT&T also started handing over cell phone metadata: 1.1 billion a day.

Media related to FAIRVIEW

External links 
 NSA Spying Relies on AT&T’s ‘Extreme Willingness to Help’
 FAIRVIEW: Collecting foreign intelligence inside the US

References

2013 scandals
Intelligence agency programmes revealed by Edward Snowden
Counterterrorism in the United States
Espionage
Human rights
Mass surveillance
National Security Agency
Obama administration controversies
Privacy in the United States
Privacy of telecommunications
Surveillance scandals
Surveillance
United States national security policy
War on terror